Microlechia maculata is a moth in the family Gelechiidae. It was described by Povolný in 1978. It is found in South Africa.

The length of the forewings is about 4.8 mm. The forewings are cinereous, with scales with pale brown tips, the darkest concentrated apically, while others form brownish spots. The hindwings are pale cinereous.

References

Microlechia
Moths described in 1978